Driftmier is a surname. Notable people with the surname include:

John Driftmier (1982–2013), Canadian documentary filmmaker
Leanna Field Driftmier (1886–1976), American radio personality and writer